Ricardo Funch (born August 14, 1980) is a Brazilian professional mixed martial artist currently competing in the Welterweight division. A professional competitor since 2006, Funch has formerly competed for the UFC.

Mixed martial arts career

Ultimate Fighting Championship
Funch signed a four-fight deal with UFC and made his UFC debut against fellow undefeated fighter Johny Hendricks on December 12, 2009 at UFC 107. He lost the fight via unanimous decision.

Funch was next scheduled to fight at UFC 111 against Matthew Riddle, but was forced to pull out of the fight.

Funch then faced UFC newcomer Claude Patrick on June 12, 2010 at UFC 115. In the second round Funch was submitted by a guillotine choke. After going 0–2 in the promotion, Funch was released from the UFC.

Post UFC
Following his first UFC release, Funch took some time off, but would return to action on December 3, 2011 at Premier FC 7 picking up a decision win over Bellator vet Ryan Quinn.

Return to UFC
Funch returned to the UFC to replace an injured Paulo Thiago against Mike Pyle on January 14, 2012 at UFC 142. He was defeated by Pyle via first round TKO after being stunned by a straight right, dropped by a knee and finished with punches.

Funch fought Dan Miller on June 22, 2012 at UFC on FX 4. He lost the bout in the third round via submission due to a guillotine choke.

After dropping to 0–4 within the promotion, Funch was released from the UFC once again.

Post-UFC
Following his second UFC release, Funch took some time off, but would return to action on October 10, 2014 at CES MMA 26 and suffered a submission loss to Ultimate Fighting Championship vet Chuck O'Neil in a bout for the CES MMA Welterweight Championship.

Mixed martial arts record

|-
|Loss
|align=center|9-6
|Matt Secor
|Submission (kneebar)
|Premier FC 20
|
|align=center|2
|align=center|3:35
|Springfield, Massachusetts, United States
|
|-
|Win
|align=center|9–5
|Brett Oteri
|KO (punches)
|Premier FC 18
|
|align=center| 1
|align=center| 0:21
|Springfield, Massachusetts, United States
|
|-
|Loss
|align=center|8–5
|Chuck O'Neil
|Submission (armbar)
|CES MMA 26
|
|align=center|2
|align=center|2:51
|Lincoln, Rhode Island, United States
|
|-
|Loss
|align=center|8–4
|Dan Miller
|Submission (guillotine choke)
|UFC on FX: Maynard vs. Guida
| 
|align=center|3
|align=center|3:12
| Atlantic City, New Jersey, United States
|
|-
|Loss
|align=center|8–3
|Mike Pyle
|TKO (knee and punches)
|UFC 142
| 
|align=center|1
|align=center|1:22
| Rio de Janeiro, Brazil
|
|-
|Win
|align=center|8–2
|Ryan Quinn
|Decision (unanimous)
|Premier FC 7
|
|align=center|3
|align=center|5:00
|Amherst, Massachusetts, United States
|
|-
|Loss
|align=center|7–2
|Claude Patrick
|Submission (guillotine choke)
|UFC 115
|
|align=center|2
|align=center|1:48
|Vancouver, British Columbia, Canada
|
|-
|Loss
|align=center|7–1
|Johny Hendricks
|Decision (unanimous)
|UFC 107
|
|align=center|3
|align=center|5:00
|Memphis, Tennessee, United States
|
|-
|Win
|align=center|7–0
|Denis Grachev
|Decision (unanimous)
|Cage Fight: MMA2
|
|align=center|3
|align=center|5:00
|Manchester, New Hampshire, United States
|
|-
|Win
|align=center|6–0
|TJ Waldburger
|TKO (punches)
|XFC: Xtreme Fighting Championships
|
|align=center|2
|align=center|2:35
|Austin, Texas, United States
|
|-
|Win
|align=center|5–0
|Woody Weatherby
|KO (punches)
|WFL 20: Calloway Cup 8
|
|align=center|1
|align=center|N/A
|Revere, Massachusetts, United States
|Won WFL Welterweight Championship.
|-
|Win
|align=center|4–0
|Chandler Holderness
|Decision (unanimous)
|WFL 17: Unleashed 2
|
|align=center|3
|align=center|5:00
|Revere, Massachusetts, United States
|
|-
|Win
|align=center|3–0
|Justin Gould
|TKO (punches)
|WFL 16: Moment of Truth 2
|
|align=center|1
|align=center|N/A
|Revere, Massachusetts, United States
|
|-
|Win
|align=center|2–0
|Calvin Bates
|Submission (rear-naked choke)
|WFL 13: Calloway Cup 4
|
|align=center|1
|align=center|N/A
|Revere, Massachusetts, United States
|
|-
|Win
|align=center|1–0
|Johnathan Sola
|TKO (punches)
|RF: Invasion
|
|align=center|1
|align=center|N/A
|Manchester, New Hampshire, United States
|

See also
List of male mixed martial artists
List of Brazilian jiu-jitsu practitioners

References

External links
 
 

Brazilian male mixed martial artists
Welterweight mixed martial artists
Mixed martial artists utilizing Brazilian jiu-jitsu
Brazilian expatriate sportspeople in the United States
Living people
1980 births
Brazilian people of German descent
Brazilian practitioners of Brazilian jiu-jitsu
People awarded a black belt in Brazilian jiu-jitsu
People from Ludlow, Massachusetts
Ultimate Fighting Championship male fighters